A list of the films produced in Mexico in 1973 (see 1973 in film):

See also
1973 in Mexico

External links

1973
Films
Mexican